The Hancock House, also known as the "Alpha House," is a historic home located at Bluefield in Mercer County, West Virginia, United States.  It was built in 1907, and is a large, 2½-story frame dwelling in the American Foursquare style. It features a massive, very deep porch encircling the house on the front and side elevations and a porte cochere.  The house was purchased by the Alpha Phi Alpha fraternity of Bluefield State College in 1962.

It was listed on the National Register of Historic Places in 1990.

References

African-American history of West Virginia
American Foursquare architecture in West Virginia
Bluefield State College
Houses in Mercer County, West Virginia
Fraternity and sorority houses
Houses completed in 1907
Houses on the National Register of Historic Places in West Virginia
National Register of Historic Places in Mercer County, West Virginia
Alpha Phi Alpha
Buildings and structures in Bluefield, West Virginia